Philip Reyley (recte O’Reilly) (c. 1630 – after 1689) was an M.P. for Cavan County (Parliament of Ireland constituency) in the Parliament of Ireland of 1689, known as the Patriot Parliament. He was known as Philip Reilly senior to distinguish him from Philip Og O'Reilly the contemporaneous M.P. for Cavan Borough. He lived in Aghacreevy townland in the Civil Parish of Ballymachugh, Barony of Clanmahon, County Cavan. Reyley was probably the Philip Reilly senior who was elected a member of Cavan Corporation on 23 February 1688.

References

Politicians from County Cavan
Irish MPs 1689
Irish Jacobites
Members of the Parliament of Ireland (pre-1801) for County Cavan constituencies
17th-century deaths
17th-century births
Year of birth missing
Year of death missing